The Macron Southern Combination Football League is a football league broadly covering the counties of East Sussex, West Sussex, Surrey and South West London, England. The league consists of eight divisions – three for first teams (Premier Division, Division One and Division Two), two for Under 23 teams (East Division and West Division) and three for Under 18 teams (East Division, Central Division and West Division).

History

Formed in 1920 as the Sussex County Football League, started with just one league with 12 teams. By the end of the 1929–30 season, six of the original twelve teams remained, having played in every campaign since the competition began. The league saw regular changes in members between 1921 and 1928 and saw 23 clubs taking part. The league closed down during the Second World War and the league ran two competition sections in the 1945–46 season, an Eastern division with eight teams and a Western division with 9 teams. The winners of each competition played in a play-off for a champion. A normal single league practice resumed in 1946 with 14 clubs now playing.

A new division was created in 1952 when Division Two was instituted. Division One remained with 14 teams and Division Two with 12 teams. By 1958 the two leagues had 16 teams each. The 1962–63 season was abandoned due to the atrocious weather conditions, with some clubs playing over 20 games and others with only 13 or 14 games played; an emergency competition was played in a group stage style format with knock-out stages to the final. The 1970s saw the league membership decline.
 
In 1983 a third division was added for intermediate level teams looking for an easy entry into the football league pyramid system, and a 3-points-for-a-win system was introduced. Divisions One and Two remained at 16 teams each, Division Three started with 13 teams, increasing to 15 two seasons later. Some long term clubs experienced harder times and dropped into Division Two. A "Two Up Two Down" system of promotion and relegation was applied throughout the period but was occasionally affected by departures from the league itself.  Division One increased to 18 teams for the 1988–89 season and 20 teams for the 1993–94 season, along with Division One increasing to 18 teams in the same season. Division Three increased to 16 teams in 2000.

The league changed its name to the Southern Combination Football League for the start of the 2015–16 season, keeping the acronym SCFL also attracting teams just across the Sussex border when the Football Association (FA) moved teams across leagues. The divisions were renamed at this time to Premier Division, Division One and Division Two, with the last keeping its intermediate status. Also, for the 2015–16 season the league added two U21s divisions, one in the East, and one in the West, consisting of 7 teams each, which lasted until the end of the 2017–18 season and replaced by two Under–23 divisions (East and West), and three Under–18 divisions (East, Central and West).

The Sin Bin rule was introduced for the 2019–20 season to reduce dissent between the players, also during the same season the coronavirus (COVID-19) pandemic halted all sporting events nationwide; the leagues and the Football Association agreed to end the season early and expunge all results, with no promotion or relegation between the leagues.

The league season was abandoned for a third time after the FA Alliance and Leagues committees announced that the 2020–21 would be curtailed, subject to ratification by The FA Council, with immediate effect.

The first team divisions – Premier, One and Two, sit at Steps 5 and 6, and level 11, formerly Step 7, of the English football league system, below the lower divisions of the Isthmian League and the Southern League. The reserve divisions are not part of the league system.

Sponsorship
In the past, Unijet, Rich City, Matthew Clark and Badger Ales sponsored the Sussex County Football League. But between 2006 and 2014 the league was without a sponsor. Macron Store (Hastings) signed a 4-year deal beginning in the 2014–15 season resulting in the official name being changed to "The Macron Sussex County League" and then to current "The Macron Southern Combination Football League". As of 2020 Macron Store still continue to sponsor the league.

Current clubs

Premier Division
Alfold
Bexhill United
Broadbridge Heath
Crawley Down Gatwick
Crowborough Athletic
Eastbourne Town
Eastbourne United Association
Hassocks
Horsham YMCA
Little Common
Lingfield
Loxwood
Midhurst & Easebourne
Newhaven
Peacehaven & Telscombe
Roffey
Saltdean United
Steyning Town Community
AFC Uckfield Town
AFC Varndeanians

Division One
Arundel
Billingshurst
Chessington & Hook United
Dorking Wanderers Reserves
East Preston
Epsom & Ewell
Forest Row
Godalming Town
Hailsham Town
Mile Oak
Montpelier Villa
Oakwood
Seaford Town
Selsey
Shoreham
Wick
Worthing United

Division Two
Bosham
Brighton Electricity
Capel
Charlwood
Copthorne
Ferring
Jarvis Brook
Rottingdean Village
Rustington
St Francis Rangers
Southwater
Storrington
Upper Beeding
Worthing Town

Former clubs
Following former clubs are now playing in other leagues or levels.

Bognor Regis Town
Burgess Hill Town
Chichester City
Crawley Town
Cuckfield Town
Dorking Wanderers
East Grinstead Town
Eastbourne Borough
Hastings United
Haywards Heath Town
Horley Town
Horsham
Lancing
Lewes
Littlehampton Town
Littlehampton United
Pagham
Redhill
Sidley United
Three Bridges
Westfield
Whitehawk
Worthing

Defunct clubs
Only clubs with articles are listed

Corps of Signals (1920-1925)
Langney Wanderers (2010-2021)
Littlehampton United (2008-2022)
Ringmer (1963-2018)

St Leonards (1971-2003)
Southwick (1882-2020)
Rye United (1938-2014)
Withdean (1989–2000)

Champions

1920–1939
The league originally consisted of a single section of 12 clubs, and had reached a stable membership of 14 clubs when it was abandoned on the outbreak of World War II. The fore-runner of the League Cup, known then as the Baldwin Cup (generically Invitation Cup) was introduced in 1938-39 with six teams invited. Lewes were the inaurgural final winners beating Littlehampton 5-0 at Newhaven on 6 May 1939.

1939–1941
During the Second World War an emergency competition was played. The league operated two region divisions, East and West, with the winners of each playing in a play-off

1945–1946
For the first post-War season, the league also operated two regional divisions, East and West, with the winners of each facing each other in a play-off.

1946–1952
After a single split format, the league reverted to a single division for the next six seasons.

1952–1983
A second division was instituted in 1952. A two-division format continued for over 30 years, the only deviation being in the 1962–63 season when the unusually harsh winter weather made the league impossible to finish. The normal league competitions were abandoned and a set of emergency competitions were played for in the second half of the season.

1983–2015
After a two division format had proved sufficient for over 30 years, a third division was added in 1983. While the top two divisions were for clubs holding senior status with the Sussex FA, the new Division Three was for clubs of intermediate status.

2015–present
In 2015, the Sussex County Football League was re-branded to the Southern Combination Football League, keeping the acronym SCFL. The divisions were renamed to Premier Division, Division One and Division Two, Division Two clubs still holding intermediate status.

Promoted
Since the league's formation, the following clubs have won promotion to higher levels of the English football league system. Crawley Town are currently the only English Football League team to play in the Sussex County League.

Most championship title wins

Premier Division (Division One 1952–2015)

Division One (Division Two 1952–2015)

Division Two (Division Three 1983–2015)

References

External links
 Southern Combination Football League

 
Football in West Sussex
Football in East Sussex
9
Sports leagues established in 1920
1920 establishments in England